Mark William Knowles  (born 10 March 1984) is the Australian field hockey captain. He has played professional hockey in the Netherlands for HC Rotterdam. He plays for the Queensland Blades in the Australian Hockey League. He has been the captain of the Australia men's national field hockey team the Kookaburras since 2014. He won a gold medal at the 2004 Summer Olympics, the 2014 World Cup, the 2005 and 2012 Champions Trophy.

Personal
Mark Knowles is from Rockhampton, Queensland. He lives in Brisbane with his wife, Kelly (sister of Australian Hockey teammate, Jamie Dwyer) and their two sons.

Field hockey
Knowles played professional hockey in 2008 and 2011 in the Netherlands for HC Rotterdam. He plays for the Queensland Blades in the Australian Hockey League. In 2010, he played in the final game of the season for his team.

National team
Knowles is the captain of the Australia men's national field hockey team. In 2006, he represented Australia at the Azlan Shah tournament in Malaysia. He competed in the 2007 Champions Trophy competition for Australia. In December 2007, he was a member of the Kookaburras squad that competed in the Dutch Series in Canberra. In January 2008, he was a member of the senior national team that competed at the Five Nations men's hockey tournament in South Africa. He was a member of the 2009 Champions Trophy winning team, playing in the gold medal match against Germany that Australia won by a score of 5–3. New national team coach Ric Charlesworth named him, a returning member, and fourteen total new players who had few than 10 national team caps to the squad before in April 2009 in a bid to ready the team for the 2010 Commonwealth Games. He was a member of the national team in 2010. That year, he was a member of the team that finished first at the Hockey Champions Trophy. Because of other commitments, he could not compete at the Azlan Shah Cup in Malaysia in May 2011. In December 2011, he was named as one of twenty-eight players to be on the 2012 Summer Olympics Australian men's national training squad.  This squad will be narrowed in June 2012.  He trained with the team from 18 January to mid-March in Perth, Western Australia. In February during the training camp, he played in a four nations test series with the teams being the Kookaburras, Australia A Squad, the Netherlands and Argentina. He is one of several Queensland based players likely to play in a three-game test series to be played in Cairns, Queensland from 22 to 25 June against the New Zealand's Black Stickss. Final Olympic section will occur several days before this test and his inclusion in the series will be contingent upon being selected.

Recognition

In the 2005 Australia Day Honours Knowles was awarded a Medal of the Order of Australia (OAM).

In 2007, Knowles was honoured by being named the Young Player of the Year by the International Hockey Federation. In 2015, Knowles was honoured by being named the 2014 World Player of the Year, following on from his performances at the 2014 Hockey World Cup, by the International Hockey Federation. He has been the Kookaburras captain since 2014.

Knowles was the Australian flag bearer at the 2018 Commonwealth Games opening ceremony on 4 April 2018.  He was also a baton runner during the Rockhampton leg of the Queen's Baton Relay on 23 March 2018 in the lead up to the Commonwealth Games.

References

External links
 
  (2006, 2010)
  (2014)
 
 
 

1984 births
Olympic field hockey players of Australia
Olympic gold medalists for Australia
Commonwealth Games gold medallists for Australia
Olympic bronze medalists for Australia
Field hockey players at the 2004 Summer Olympics
Field hockey players at the 2008 Summer Olympics
2006 Men's Hockey World Cup players
2010 Men's Hockey World Cup players
2014 Men's Hockey World Cup players
Field hockey players at the 2006 Commonwealth Games
Field hockey players at the 2010 Commonwealth Games
Recipients of the Medal of the Order of Australia
Sportspeople from Rockhampton
Olympic medalists in field hockey
Australian male field hockey players
Living people
Sportsmen from Queensland
Field hockey players at the 2012 Summer Olympics
Medalists at the 2012 Summer Olympics
Medalists at the 2008 Summer Olympics
Field hockey players at the 2014 Commonwealth Games
Medalists at the 2004 Summer Olympics
Field hockey players at the 2016 Summer Olympics
Commonwealth Games medallists in field hockey
HC Rotterdam players
Australian expatriate sportspeople in the Netherlands
Expatriate field hockey players
Hockey India League players
Men's Hoofdklasse Hockey players
Medallists at the 2006 Commonwealth Games
Medallists at the 2010 Commonwealth Games
Medallists at the 2014 Commonwealth Games